King Mswati III International Airport , initially named Sikhuphe International Airport in the planning and construction phase, is an airport in Eswatini. It replaced Matsapha Airport as the only international airport in Eswatini accepting commercial flights in 2014. It is designed to handle 360,000 passengers per year.

Construction
Construction began in 2003 on this $150m project. The Taiwanese government contributed US$22m to the project.

It is part of King Mswati III's $1bn millennium project investment initiative to enhance Eswatini's position as a tourist destination, serving as a tourism gateway to Eswatini's game parks, either domestic or nearby located ones, such as Victoria Falls, Maputo, the Kruger National Park and  KwaZulu-Natal game reserves. However, it has been on the drawing board since 1980, and since then Kruger Mpumalanga International Airport has opened and Maputo and Durban airports have been upgraded. There are also environmental concerns since Sikhupe is near Hlane game park, and may put rare species of eagles and vultures at risk.

King Mswati III International Airport was planned to replace Matsapha airport by 2010, with the latter being taken over by the army.

King Mswati III International Airport was inaugurated on 7 March 2014, despite not yet having an IATA license to operate. Service began 30 September 2014.

Facilities
Plans include a 3,600m CAT 1 runway, and capacity for 300,000 passengers per year. It would be able to handle Boeing 747 aircraft, and service flights to any destination in the world.

Airlines and destinations

References

External links

 OpenStreetMap - Sikhuphe International Airport
 King Mswati-III International Airport website
 

Airports in Eswatini